Wang Prachan is a sub-district (tambon) of Khuan Don District, Satun Province of Thailand, at the boundary to Malaysia.

Thai Hwy 4181, which passes through the sub-district, connects Satun with Wang Kelian in Malaysia.

, the sub-district has a population of 2,380.

Administration
The sub-district is led by a tambon administrative organization (TAO), which was established in 2004. The sub-district itself was established in 1914, and is divided into four villages (muban).

Pictures

References

External links
Tambon.com (Thai)

Geography of Satun province
Tambon of Satun Province
Malaysia–Thailand border crossings